Kyzylorda Airport  is an airport located  southeast of Kyzylorda (formerly known as Kzyl-Orda), the capital city of the Kyzylorda Region in Kazakhstan.

Facilities
It has one runway which measures .

Airlines and destinations

References

External links
 
 

Airports in Kazakhstan
Kyzylorda Region